Gautam Kumar Shome (28 May 1958 – 10 February 2023), known as Gautam Shome Senior during his career, was an Indian cricketer. He played seven first-class matches for Bengal between 1984 and 1986.

Shome died on 10 February 2023, at the age of 64.

See also
 List of Bengal cricketers

References

External links
 

1960 births
2023 deaths
Bengal cricketers
Cricketers from Kolkata
Indian cricketers